Marco Antonio Villanueva Rodríguez (born June 9, 1993, in Mazatlán, Sinaloa) is a Mexican professional footballer who last played for Universidad Autónoma de Zacatecas FC.

References

External links
 

1993 births
Living people
Mexican footballers
Association football defenders
Dorados de Sinaloa footballers
Universidad Autónoma de Zacatecas FC footballers
Ascenso MX players
Liga Premier de México players
Tercera División de México players
Footballers from Sinaloa
Sportspeople from Mazatlán